KK Ulcinj (Cyrillic: КК Улцињ) is a professional basketball club from the city of Ulcinj, Montenegro. The club currently participates in the Montenegrin Basketball League. They also took part in the Balkan International Basketball League twice. They were finalist of Montenegrin Cup once and were several times in semifinals of Montenegrin championship play-offs.

External links
 KK Ulcinj at balkanleague.net
 Eurobasket.com KK Ulcinj Page

References

Ulcinj
Basketball teams established in 1976
Sport in Ulcinj
Ulcinj